Taylor is a single-member electoral district for the South Australian House of Assembly. This district is named after Doris Irene Taylor MBE, a leading force in the founding of Meals on Wheels, and Labor activist. Taylor is a 246.2 km2 semi-urban electorate in Adelaide's outer northern suburbs and market gardens on the Adelaide Northern plains. A large portion of the district lives in the western half of the City of Playford and it is regarded as a safe Labor seat. It now includes the suburbs and townships of Andrews Farm, Angle Vale, Bolivar, Buckland Park, Davoren Park, Edinburgh, Edinburgh North, Elizabeth North, Eyre, Macdonald Park, Munno Para West, Penfield, Penfield Gardens, Riverlea Park, Smithfield, Smithfield Plains, St Kilda, Virginia, and Waterloo Corner.

History
Taylor was created for the 1993 state election between the northern metropolitan seat of Ramsay and rural Goyder, and was won by the defeated Labor Premier Lynn Arnold. He resigned in 1994, triggering a Taylor by-election which saw Trish White retain the seat for Labor.

Following the redistribution of 2003 the northern boundary of the district was Light River and it sketched from the Gulf of St Vincent in the west to Lewiston and Reeves Plains in the North East, Curtis Road in the City of Playford to the East, to the outer northern suburbs of Burton, Direk and parts of Paralowie and Salisbury North to the South.

Following the 2016 Boundary redistribution a major change occurred with approximately 40% of the electors of Taylor from the suburbs of Paralowie and Salisbury North in the City of Salisbury being moved to Electoral district of Ramsay and being replaced by Elizabeth North which was added from the abolished district of Electoral district of Little Para and Davoren Park, Smithfield, Smithfield Plains from the abolished district of Electoral district of Napier, and Township of Angle Vale from Electoral district of Light all from the City of Playford. The previous member for Napier Jon Gee replaced the retiring member of Taylor Leesa Vlahos at the 2018 Election.

Due to being above the 10% quota threshold the 2020 Boundary redistribution the Gawler River has again become the northern boundary with Port Gawler, Middle Beach and Two Wells within the Adelaide Plains Council moving to a redrawn Electoral district of Frome and the southern boundary also changing with the suburbs of Burton, Direk and remaining portion of Salibury North from the City of Salisbury moving to the Electoral district of Ramsay. A portion of Munno Para West within the City of Playford from the Electoral district of Light was added.

Members for Taylor

Election results

Notes

References
 ECSA profile for Taylor: 2018
 ABC profile for Taylor: 2018
 Poll Bludger profile for Taylor: 2018

1993 establishments in Australia
Electoral districts of South Australia